Mount Tedrow is a mountain in the Queen Elizabeth Range, 1,490 m, standing at the east side of the mouth of DeBreuck Glacier at its juncture with Kent Glacier. Mapped by the United States Geological Survey (USGS) from tellurometer surveys and Navy air photos, 1960–62. Named by Advisory Committee on Antarctic Names (US-ACAN) for Jack V. Tedrow, United States Antarctic Research Program (USARP) glaciologist at McMurdo Station, 1959–60, 1960–61.

Mountains of the Ross Dependency
Shackleton Coast